In mathematics, a Jacobi form is an automorphic form on the Jacobi group, which is the semidirect product of the symplectic group Sp(n;R) and the Heisenberg group .

Definition
A Jacobi form of level 1, weight k and index m is a function  of two complex variables (with τ in the upper half plane) such that

 for all integers λ, μ.
 has a Fourier expansion

Examples
Examples in two variables include Jacobi theta functions, the Weierstrass ℘ function, and Fourier–Jacobi coefficients of Siegel modular forms of genus 2. Examples with more than two variables include characters of some irreducible highest-weight representations of affine Kac–Moody algebras. Meromorphic Jacobi forms appear in the theory of Mock modular forms.

References

Modular forms
Theta functions